East Asian people (East Asians) are the people from East Asia, which consists of China, Japan, Mongolia, North Korea, South Korea, and Taiwan. The total population of all countries within this region is estimated to be 1.677 billion and 21% of the world's population in 2020. However, large East Asian diasporas, such as the Chinese, Japanese, Korean, and Mongolian diasporas, as well as diasporas of other East Asian ethnic groups, mean that the 1.677 billion does not necessarily represent an accurate figure for the numbers of East Asian people worldwide.

The major ethnic groups that form the core of East Asia are the Han, Koreans, and Yamato. Other ethnic groups of East Asia include the Ainu, Bai, Hui, Manchus, Mongols and other Mongolic peoples, Nivkh, Qiang, Ryukyuans, Tibetans, and Yakuts.

Culture 

The major East Asian language families are the Sinitic, Japonic, and Koreanic families. Other language families include the Tibeto-Burman, Ainu languages, Mongolic, Tungusic, Turkic, Hmong-Mien, Tai–Kadai, Austronesian, and Austroasiatic.

Throughout the ages, the greatest influence on East Asia historically has been from China, where the span of its cultural influence is generally known as the Sinosphere laid the foundation for East Asian civilization with the exception of Mongolia. Chinese culture not only served as the foundation for its own society and civilization, but for also that of its East Asian neighbors, Japan and Korea. The knowledge and ingenuity of Chinese civilization and the classics of Chinese literature and culture were seen as the foundations for a civilized life in East Asia. China served as a vehicle through which the adoption of Confucian ethical philosophy, Chinese calendar systems, political and legal systems, architectural style, diet, terminology, institutions, religious beliefs, imperial examinations that emphasized a knowledge of Chinese classics, political philosophy and culture,  as well as historically sharing a common writing system reflected in the histories of Japan and Korea. The relationship between China and its cultural influence on East Asia has been compared to the historical influence of Greco-Roman civilization on Europe and the Western World. Major characteristics exported by China towards Japan and Korea include shared Chinese-derived language characteristics, as well as similar social and moral philosophies derived from Confucianist thought.

The script of the Han Chinese characters has long been a unifying feature in East Asian writing system as the vehicle for exporting Chinese culture to its East Asian neighbors. Chinese characters became the unifying language of bureaucratic politics and religious expression in East Asia. The Chinese script was passed on first to Korea and then to Japan, where it forms a major component of the Japanese writing system. In Korea, however, Sejong the Great invented the hangul alphabet, which has since been used as the main orthographic system for the Korean language. In Japan, much of the Japanese language is written in hiragana, katakana in addition to Chinese characters. In Mongolia, the script used there is the Cyrillic script along with the Mongolian script system.

Genetics

Health

Alcohol flush reaction 

Alcohol flush reaction is the characteristic physiological facial flushing response to drinking alcohol experienced by 36% of East Asians.  Around 80% of East Asians carry an allele of the gene coding for the enzyme alcohol dehydrogenase called ADH1B*2, which results in the alcohol dehydrogenase enzyme converting alcohol to toxic acetaldehyde more quickly than other gene variants common outside of East Asia. According to the analysis by HapMap project, another allele responsible for the flush reaction, the rs671 (ALDH2*2) of the ALDH2 is rare among Europeans and Sub-Saharan Africans, while 30% to 50% of people of Chinese, Japanese, and Korean ancestry have at least one ALDH2*2 allele. The reaction has been associated with lower than average rates of alcoholism, possibly due to its association with adverse effects after drinking alcohol.

See also
 Ethnic groups in Asia
 Oriental

Notes

References